NDT may refer to:

 National Debate Tournament, a national championship of intercollegiate policy debate
 Ndunga language, represented by ISO 639 code 
 Nederlands Dans Theater
 Neolithic discontinuity theory
 Neil deGrasse Tyson (born 1958), American astrophysicist
 Neue Deutsche Todeskunst, a music genre
 Neurodevelopmental treatment
 Newfoundland Daylight Time
 Nil ductility temperature, the temperature at which brittle fracture in a normally ductile material becomes 100 percent cleavage
 Nondestructive testing, a type of testing which does not damage or destroy the original object
 Noriko's Dinner Table (2006), a Japanese film by Sono Sion
 Normal distributions transform, a point cloud registration algorithm
 Nephrology Dialysis Transplantation, a medical nephrology journal